Ali Baba is an Indian fantasy television series based on the Arabian Nights character Ali Baba. The series follows the life of an orphan Alibaba, from the Mamuli Gali of Kabul, and the challenges he faces while he tries to protect and take care of five other orphan children. The series premiered on 22 August 2022 on Sony SAB and digitally streams on SonyLIV.

Series overview

Episode list

Chapter 1: Dastaan-E-Kabul

Chapter 2: Ek Andaaz Andekha 

-->

References

External links 
 
 Alibaba - Dastaan-e-Kabul on SonyLIV
 Ali Baba Dastaan – E – Kabul on Sony SAB

Hindi serials episodes articles
Lists of Indian television series episodes